Gandhi Nagar is a middle-income commercial-cum-residential area in the East Delhi district of Delhi in the Trans-Yamuna area. It is most known for Gandhi Nagar Market, which is Asia’s biggest readymade garments/textile market. Gandhi Nagar has many shops and factories. 

Administratively it is one of the three subdivision of the East Delhi district (the others being Preet Vihar and Vivek Vihar) and one of the ten state legislative assembly constituencies under the East Delhi (Lok Sabha constituency), presently represented by Gautam Gambhir
The area is one of the most congested colonies with a population of around 3.5 lakh. It has one of highest Muslim populations which are workers in the factory in the East Delhi constituency at 22%.

It had been listed as a notorious market between 2016 and 2017 by the USTR for selling counterfeit apparel.

Residential colonies

It is surrounded by other colonies including Geeta Colony, Seelampur and Krishna Nagar. The colonies under this Assembly Constituency are:

 Raghubar Pura Part I and Part II ( Sri Bhawani Devi Mahakali Mandir)
Mahila Colony
 Chand Mohalla
 Shanti Mohalla
 Rajgarh Colony
 Subhash Road
 Ram Nagar
 Amar Mohalla
 Kailash Nagar
 Nanak Basti
 Old Seelampur village
 Ghas Mandi
 Subhash Mohalla
 Ajit Nagar
 Dharampura
 Jain Mohalla
 Shankar Nagar
 Jheel
 Budh Bazar

Education
 Rajkiya Pratibha Vikash  Vidyalaya
 Geeta Bal Bharti
 Tagore Public School, Subhash Mohalla
 S.B.V. Rajgarh Colony
 Gandhi Nagar Girls School
 R.A. Geeta. Sr. Sec. School, Shankar Nagar
 Chaudhary Malook Singh School, Jheel
 D.A.V. Govt School
 Sai Memorial Girls Senior Secondary School
 St. Lawrence Public School

Transportation

To make road travel from Mayur Vihar Phase I to Gandhi Nagar traffic-signal-free, four major road infrastructure projects worth Rs.412 crore, including the Geeta Colony bridge were inaugurated in 2009 by Delhi Chief Minister Sheila Dikshit.

References

External links
 Gandhi Nagar, Delhi at wikimapia
 Google maps of Gandhi Nagar Delhi

East Delhi district
District subdivisions of Delhi
Notorious markets